Edward D. Burke (October 6, 1866 – November 26, 1907) was a Major League Baseball outfielder. He played all or part of eight seasons, from  until . During that time, he played for five teams: the Philadelphia Phillies, Pittsburgh Alleghenys, Milwaukee Brewers, Cincinnati Reds, and New York Giants.

In 1890, Burke was traded in midseason along with pitcher Bill Day for Billy Sunday. This is the only recorded time the famed evangelist was traded during his baseball career.

In 855 games over eight seasons, Burke posted a .280 batting average (983-for-3516) with 747 runs, 30 home runs, 413 RBIs, 293 stolen bases and 319 bases on balls.

See also

 List of Major League Baseball career stolen bases leaders

Sources

External links

1866 births
1907 deaths
Major League Baseball outfielders
Baseball players from Pennsylvania
Philadelphia Phillies players
Pittsburgh Pirates players
Milwaukee Brewers (AA) players
New York Giants (NL) players
Cincinnati Reds players
19th-century baseball players
Lewiston Independents players
Danville (minor league baseball) players
Scranton Indians players
Scranton Miners players
Toronto Canucks players
Milwaukee Brewers (minor league) players
St. Paul Apostles players
St. Paul Saints (Western League) players
Butte Smoke Eaters players
Chicago White Stockings (minor league) players
Minneapolis Millers (baseball) players
Buffalo Bisons (minor league) players
Spokane Blue Stockings players
American expatriate baseball players in Canada
People from Northumberland, Pennsylvania